Escuela Cristóbal Colón ("Christopher Columbus School") may refer to:
Escuela Cristóbal Colón de la Salle (Mexico City)
Escuela Cristóbal Colón (Puerto Rico)
Escuela Zuliana de Avanzada “Cristóbal Colón” - Maracaibo, Venezuela